Republic County USD 109 is a public unified school district headquartered in Belleville, Kansas, United States.  The district includes the communities of Belleville, Agenda, Cuba, Munden, Narka, Republic, Harbine, Talmo, Wayne, and nearby rural areas.

Schools
The school district operates the following schools:
 Republic County High School
 Republic County Middle School
 Belleville East Elementary School

History
It was formed in 2006 by the consolidation of Belleville USD 427 and Hillcrest USD 455.

See also
 Kansas State Department of Education
 Kansas State High School Activities Association
 List of high schools in Kansas
 List of unified school districts in Kansas

References

External links
 

School districts in Kansas
School districts established in 2006
2006 establishments in Kansas
Republic County, Kansas